TRNA (adenine57-N1/adenine58-N1)-methyltransferase (TrmI, PabTrmI, AqTrmI, MtTrmI) is an enzyme with systematic name S-adenosyl-L-methionine:tRNA (adenine57/adenine58-N1)-methyltransferase. This enzyme catalyses the following chemical reaction:

2 S-adenosyl-L-methionine + adenine57/adenine58 in tRNA  2 S-adenosyl-L-homocysteine + N1-methyladenine57/N1-methyladenine58 in tRNA

The enzyme catalyses the formation of N1-methyladenine at two adjacent positions (57 and 58) in the T-loop of certain tRNAs .

References

External links 
 

EC 2.1.1